Hagedorn is a surname of German language origin, meaning "hawthorn". Notable people with the surname include:

 Bettina Hagedorn (born 1955), German politician
 Bob Hagedorn, US Democratic legislator from Colorado
 Brian Hagedorn, Wisconsin Judge
 Britt Hagedorn, German model and talk show host
 Edward Hagedorn (artist) (1902–1982), American artist
 Edward S. Hagedorn, mayor of the city Puerto Princesa in the Philippines
 Eric E. Hagedorn, American politician
 Erwin Hagedorn (1952–1972), German serial killer
 Friedrich Hagedorn, 19th-century German watercolorist
 Friedrich von Hagedorn, early 18th-century German poet
 Gregor Hagedorn (born 1965), German botanist
 Hans Christian Hagedorn, Danish biologist and pharmacologist with focus on insulin research
 Hermann Hagedorn (1882–1964), American author, poet and biographer
 Hermann Hagedorn (poet) (1884–1951), German poet
 Horace Hagedorn, American businessman and co-founder of the Miracle-Gro company
 Jessica Hagedorn, Filipino playwright, novelist, poet and musician living in New York
 Jim Hagedorn (1962–2022), American politician, member of the United States House of Representatives
 John Hagedorn, US associate professor of criminal justice
 Karl Hagedorn (1889–1969), German-born painter, naturalised British
 Karl Hagedorn (1922–2005), German-American painter
 Katherine Hagedorn (1961–2013), American academic
 Mary Hagedorn, US marine biologist
 Rolf Hagedorn, German physicist who spent most of his career at CERN in Geneva, Switzerland
 Tom Hagedorn (born 1943), US politician

German-language surnames